John Joseph O'Connor (July 10, 1933 – November 13, 2009) was an American journalist and critic.  He was born in The Bronx, New York.

One of four sons born to Irish immigrant parents, he earned his bachelor's degree from City College of New York and his master's degree from Yale University.

He began his career as a copy editor at The Wall Street Journal in 1959, later becoming the Journal's arts editor and theater and dance critic, in which capacity he continued at The New York Times. He served at the Times for 25 years, mostly as a television critic. O'Connor was diagnosed with lung cancer four weeks before his death at the age of 76. He died at his home in Manhattan.

References

1933 births
2009 deaths
20th-century American journalists
American dance critics
American male journalists
American people of Irish descent
American television critics
American theater critics
City College of New York alumni
Critics employed by The New York Times
Deaths from lung cancer in New York (state)
The Wall Street Journal people
Yale University alumni